is an interior designer from Ibaraki, Osaka. He undertakes projects in many countries including Japan, New York and Hong Kong.

Biography

Early life and education 
Morita was born as the eldest son of four brothers. Due to his father's occupation he was moving frequently when he was young. During his teenage years, he became involved in interior work through taking a part-time jobs in window display.

In 1989, while studying at Yashiro Gakuin University (now Kobe International University), he worked on the interior of the bar "Cool" in Kobe Sannomiya, which was featured in a specialised magazine. This was his debut work.

Career 
After graduating from university, he took a job at Imagine Co., Ltd., a design company in Osaka, where he served as chief designer.

Morita established his own company, the Yasumichi Morita Design Office, in 1996. The company was restarted as Glamorous Co., Ltd. in June 2000. He later established the Y. Morita Design (HK) Ltd. in Hong Kong in 2001.

Personal life 
On 14 March 2007, he announced his engagement with actress Mao Daichi. They were married on 25 July 2007 in the Champagne region of France.

Major works
Murata Mitsui (Kita-ku, Osaka, 1999)
Arashiyama Station (Ukyō-ku, Kyoto, 2002)
Resona Bank Tokyo Midtown Branch Office (Minato, Tokyo, 2007)
Aoyama Francfranc (Minato, Tokyo, 2010)
River Side Tower Nakanosima (Osaka, Osaka Prefecture, 2010)
Isetan Shinjuku Main Store (Shinjuku, Tokyo, 2013)

Television appearances
Another Sky (12 Nov 2010, NTV)
Contact Cafe (15 Dec 2010, NBN)

References

External links
 

1967 births
Living people
People from Ibaraki, Osaka
Japanese interior designers